Puja Gupta  is an Indian actress. She started her career as a child artist in Delhi. After studying in the U.S. she started her career in Mumbai with Paresh Rawal's play Kishen v/s Kanahiya, followed by another play, Dear Father. She has appeared in films like OMG – Oh My God!, Vicky Donor, Blood Money and Mickey Virus.

Filmography

References

External links

 

Living people
Actresses from New Delhi
Indian film actresses
Actresses in Hindi cinema
Indian expatriate actresses in the United States
Year of birth missing (living people)
21st-century Indian actresses